The Group C of the 1999 Copa América was one of the three groups of competing nations in the 1999 Copa América. It comprised Argentina, Colombia, Ecuador, and Uruguay. Group play began on July 1 and ended on July 7.

Colombia won the group and faced Chile, the best third-placed finisher, in the quarterfinals. Argentina finished second and faced Brazil, the winners of Group B, in the quarterfinals. Uruguay finished third and faced Paraguay, the winner of Group A, in the quarterfinals. Ecuador finished fourth in the group and was eliminated from the tournament.

Standings

Teams that advanced to the quarterfinals
Group winners
Group runners-up
Best two third-placed teams among all groups

Matches

Uruguay v Colombia

Argentina v Ecuador

Uruguay v Ecuador

Argentina v Colombia 
In this match Martín Palermo missed 3 penalties, one was saved by Miguel Calero. Colombia were also awarded two penalties, they scored one and missed one. So from a total of 5 penalties in this game, 4 were missed.

Colombia v Ecuador

Argentina v Uruguay

External links
Copa América 1999 Official Site

Group C
Group
1999 in Colombian football
group
1999 in Ecuadorian football